Hatzi- or Chatzi- is a prefix of Greek family names. It ultimately derives from the Arabic Hajji, a name for someone who has successfully completed a pilgrimage.

In Christianity, the prefix is added when someone had committed the pilgrimage to Jerusalem. For example, if the name was Giannis, the name would then be Hatzigiannis after the journey.  

In Islam, the prefix is added before the name. For example, Ibrahim Kaya would become Hajji Ibrahim Kaya.

See also
 Hatzis
 Hadžić
 Hatzianestis
 Hatzidakis
 Hatzimichalis
 Chatzigeorgiou

References

Greek-language surnames
Surnames